The Associates (or simply Associates) were a Scottish post-punk and pop band, formed in Dundee in 1979 by lead vocalist Billy Mackenzie and guitarist Alan Rankine. The band released an unauthorized cover version of David Bowie's "Boys Keep Swinging" as their debut single in 1979, which landed them a recording contract with Fiction Records. They followed with their debut studio album The Affectionate Punch in 1980 and the compilation album Fourth Drawer Down in 1981, both to critical praise.

They achieved commercial success in 1982 with the UK Top 10 studio album Sulk and UK Top 20 singles "Party Fears Two" and "Club Country", during which time they were associated with the New Pop movement. Rankine left the group that year, leaving MacKenzie to record under the Associates name until 1990. They briefly reunited in 1993. MacKenzie's suicide in 1997 was the band's end; Rankine died twenty six years later in 2023.

History

1979–1982: Formation and independent success
Billy Mackenzie and guitarist Alan Rankine met in Edinburgh, Scotland in 1976 and formed the cabaret duo the Ascorbic Ones, although Rankine claimed that this was "a fantasy band that Bill and I dreamt up to give ourselves a past". In 1978, they recorded songs as Mental Torture before changing the name to the Associates.

Disappointed that their early recordings were not getting picked up, Mackenzie concocted the stunt of doing a cover of David Bowie's "Boys Keep Swinging", without copyright permission, just six weeks after Bowie's version hit the UK Top 10. Released in June 1979, this debut Associates single reached No. 15 in Record Mirrors Scottish chart and gained them airplay on John Peel's Radio One show. MacKenzie later said that the band recorded the Bowie song "to prove the point. It was a strange way of proving it, but it worked. People said, 'That is awful. How dare they!'" The ensuing attention earned them a contract with Fiction Records, and their debut album, The Affectionate Punch, followed on 1 August 1980. By this time the duo of Mackenzie and Rankine had been joined by bassist Michael Dempsey and drummer John Murphy, though in most promotional material the group were still marketed as a duo.

A string of 1981 non-album singles on the label Situation Two were compiled as Fourth Drawer Down, released that October. These releases saw the band develop an interest in experimenting with unorthodox instrumentation and recording techniques, including sounds being amplified through the tube of a vacuum cleaner on the track "Kitchen Person". Also in 1981, Rankine and Mackenzie released a version of "Kites" under the name 39 Lyon Street, with Christine Beveridge on lead vocals. The B-side, "A Girl Named Property" (a remake of "Mona Property Girl" from the "Boys Keep Swinging" single), was credited to the Associates.

1982–1988: WEA/Warner years
As Situation Two's parent label Beggars Banquet had a labels deal with WEA International at the time (primarily for Gary Numan), the Associates found themselves signed to Warner with their releases now going out on their own Associates record label. The band's breakthrough came in 1982 with the release of the single "Party Fears Two". Buoyed along by the popularity of synthpop at the time, the song reached No. 9 on the UK Singles Chart with the band becoming one of the leading acts of the new pop movement. Two other hits followed, "Club Country" and "18 Carat Love Affair", a vocal version of the instrumental track "Nothinginsomethingparticular". On 14 May 1982, the band released their most commercially successful album, Sulk. Martha Ladly, of Martha and the Muffins, contributed backing vocals and keyboards to this album.

Rankine left the band in 1982 just before the Sulk tour. This proved disastrous for the band's career; the band was being courted by Seymour Stein of Sire Records, but without MacKenzie's willingness to tour, Stein lost interest. Mackenzie continued to write and record music under the name Associates until 1990. In 1985 the album Perhaps was released and charted at No. 23 in the UK Albums Chart.

In 1988, WEA/Warner rejected the fourth Associates album The Glamour Chase considering it not commercially viable (it was later released on a two-disc set with Perhaps).  However, they decided to release Mackenzie's synthpop/techno-pop cover of "Heart of Glass" as a single and also put the track on the record company's Vaultage From The Electric Lighting Station compilation. This track was to be Mackenzie's last release whilst under contract to WEA in the United Kingdom, as he signed to AVL/Virgin subsidiary Circa Records (still under the Associates name at this point).  "Heart of Glass" was released in September 1988 on a number of formats including a 12 inch single with an anaglyphic 3-D cover (which came with 3-D glasses) and a CD single. It reached number 56 on the UK Singles Chart and was put on Popera: The Singles Collection, by WEA in 1990 alongside withdrawn follow-up single "Country Boy", and a version of the Mackenzie/Boris Blank song, "The Rhythm Divine".

Between 1987 and 1992, Mackenzie worked with Blank and musical partner Dieter Meier of Swiss avant-garde outfit Yello. Mackenzie wrote the lyrics of the song "The Rhythm Divine", which can also be found on the Yello album, One Second, with lead vocals by Shirley Bassey and Mackenzie singing backing vocals. During these years Mackenzie contributed to three Yello albums: One Second (1987), Flag (1988) and Baby (1991), whilst tracks for The Glamour Chase and Outernational were recorded with Blank at Yello's recording studio.

1989–1997: Circa and solo years
After his fourth album was rejected and "Country Boy" single scrapped, Mackenzie signed to AVL/Virgin subsidiary Circa Records, to release the fifth Associates album Wild and Lonely (the fourth studio album to be released during Billy Mackenzie's lifetime). The album was released on 24 March 1990 and was produced by Australian record producer Julian Mendelsohn. It peaked at No. 71 on the UK Albums Chart and had three singles charting in the lower parts of the UK Singles Chart with "Fever", "Fire to Ice" and "Just Can't Say Goodbye", peaking at numbers 81, 92 and 79 respectively. Wild and Lonely was the last album Mackenzie recorded under the name The Associates, as from this point his releases would go out under his own name. However, recordings were sporadic and subsequent records failed to reach the UK chart and sold far fewer than their/his early albums. In 1992, Mackenzie released an electronica-influenced solo album, Outernational, for Circa Records with limited success.

In 1993, Mackenzie and Rankine began working on new material together. News of an Associates revival generated hype and speculation of a tour, and the demos recorded by the two were promising. However, Mackenzie was not fully committed to the reunion and especially touring with it, so Associates split for a final time. Mackenzie went back to his solo work, signing a deal with Nude Records and finding a new collaborative partner in Steve Aungle.

Rankine later became a lecturer in music at Stow College in Glasgow, and worked with Belle and Sebastian on their 1996 debut album, Tigermilk.

1997–present: Legacy releases
Mackenzie committed suicide in 1997 at age 39, shortly after the death of his mother. He had been suffering from clinical depression. He was contemplating a comeback at the time with material co-written with Aungle. The albums Beyond the Sun (1997) and Eurocentric (2000) were released posthumously and, in 2004, reconstructed and expanded with new unreleased songs into the two albums Auchtermatic and Transmission Impossible.

Before Mackenzie's death, almost all Associates records had been deleted. Former band member Michael Dempsey and the MacKenzie estate began a reissue programme to make sure the band's legacy continued, reissuing almost every Associates album, including a 25th anniversary edition of The Affectionate Punch in 2005. In addition to the original albums, two compilation albums were released: Double Hipness (2000), a collection of early tracks with the 1993 reunion demos; and Singles (2004), an extended version of Popera – The Singles Collection which caught up with post-1990 material and included the cover of Bowie's "Boys Keep Swinging". In 2002, The Glamour Chase (recorded in the years 1985–87) was finally released as a set titled The Glamour Chase & Perhaps. Finally, Wild and Lonely and Mackenzie's solo album Outernational were repackaged with bonus tracks in 2006.

The Tom Doyle book The Glamour Chase: The Maverick Life of Billy Mackenzie, first published in 1998 and reissued in 2011, documented the band's career and Mackenzie's subsequent life.

Rankine died on 3rd January 2023 at age 64.

Legacy and influence
The Associates drew stylistically on a variety of genres, including art rock, disco, glam, minimalism, balladry and cabaret. Their music has been described as post-punk, synth-pop, new wave and experimental pop. The group was hailed by the likes of Björk and U2 singer Bono. Björk stated that her "love affair with the Associates started when I was fifteen [...], it was Sulk I really got into". "I really admired the way Billy used and manipulated his voice on that record". Bono said about the Associates: "We ripped them off. Billy was a great singer: I couldn't rip him off". Artists who have covered "Party Fears Two", include the Divine Comedy, Dan Bryk, King Creosote and Heaven 17. Journalist Simon Reynolds, called the group "great should-have-beens of British pop". Chris Tighe wrote that the band have "been belated acknowledged as one of the '80s' most inspired pop groups".

Ian Rankin took the title of his 2015 Inspector Rebus novel, Even Dogs in the Wild, from a track on The Affectionate Punch, and the song itself has a role in the story.

Upon news of Rankine’s passing, Ladytron wrote on social media, "No Associates = No Ladytron" while saying that he was the "creator of amongst the most joyous magnificent pop music of all time."

Band members
 Billy Mackenzie – lead vocals, guitar (1979–1990, 1993) (died 1997)
 Alan Rankine – guitars, keyboards (1979–1982, 1993) (died 2023)
 John Sweeney – drums (1979–1980)
 John Murphy – drums (1980–1981) (died 2015)
 Michael Dempsey – bass guitar (1980–1982)
 Steve Goulding – drums (1982–1983)
 Martha Ladly – keyboards, backing vocals (1982-1986)
 Miffy Smith - keyboards, saxophone (1983-1984)
 Martin Lowe – live guitar (1982)
 Ian McIntosh – live and radio session guitar (1982–1985)
 Steve Reid – guitar (1982–1984)
 Roberto Soave – bass guitar (1983–1985)
 Jim Russell – drums (1984)
 Howard Hughes – keyboards (1982–1990)
 Moritz von Oswald – drums, percussion (1985–1990)

Discography

Studio albums
 The Affectionate Punch (1980)
 Sulk (1982)
 Perhaps (1985)
 Wild and Lonely (1990)

References

External links
 
 

 
Scottish new wave musical groups
Scottish pop music groups
Scottish musical duos
British synth-pop new wave groups
Musical groups established in 1979
Musical groups disestablished in 1990
Musicians from Dundee
New wave duos
Fiction Records artists
Situation Two artists
Beggars Banquet Records artists
Sire Records artists
Charisma Records artists
V2 Records artists
Warner Music Group artists
Virgin Records artists
Experimental pop musicians
Rock music duos
Scottish post-punk music groups
1979 establishments in Scotland
1990 disestablishments in Scotland